The Louisville Zoological Gardens, commonly known as the Louisville Zoo, is a  zoo in Louisville, Kentucky, situated in the city's Poplar Level neighborhood. Founded in 1969, the "State Zoo of Kentucky" currently exhibits over 1,200 animals in naturalistic and mixed animal settings representing both geographical areas and Biomes or habitats.

The Louisville Zoo is accredited by the Association of Zoos and Aquariums  and the American Alliance of Museums. During the 2006–07 season, the zoo set an all-time yearly attendance record with 810,546 visitors.

The Louisville Zoo's mission is "To better the bond between the people and our planet".

History 
The Louisville Zoo opened on May 1, 1969, with 250 animals on exhibit. The zoo was built on land acquired by the City of Louisville in the 1960s from the estate of Ben Collins. Much of the initial funding was donated by local philanthropist James Graham Brown.

Opening Day in 1969 mostly had exhibits with four-legged animals such as elephants and giraffes. The zoo also offered a train to take zoo visitors past several exhibits; this attraction operated until 2019, and the trains were ultimately sold in 2021. Opening Day had some criticism from the general public as a lack of shade was evident throughout the zoo. Over time, tree growth has reduced the problem.

In 1997, a fully restored Philadelphia Toboggan Company (PTC #49) carousel was added as an attraction. In May 2007, Glacier Run Splash Park, a children's water playground with 42 water-spray features, opened at the zoo. The splash park was the first phase of the Glacier Run area to open, which features polar bears exhibits modeled after the town of Churchill, Manitoba, Canada. In the summer of 2022 Slash Park closed due to reconstruction of the drainage mat and is set to re-open in Spring of 2023.

Exhibits 

The Louisville Zoo has eight large exhibits: The Islands, Africa, Glacier Run, Australia, South America, HerpAquarium, Gorilla Forest, and the Cats of the Americas exhibit.

Gorilla Forest 
The zoo was awarded the 2003 Association of Zoos and Aquariums Exhibit Award for its  exhibit "Gorilla Forest". The exhibit currently houses a troop of eight western lowland gorillas, and a pygmy hippopotamus. Inside the circular Gorilla Sanctuary, visitors are separated only by glass and can get nose-to-nose with the gorillas. Several different outdoor vantage points are available from which to see the gorillas playing and relaxing. In October 2022 female gorilla Helen passed away, at the time of her death she was the second oldest gorilla in history being born in Cameroon in 1958, she was known as the "Grand Dame" of the gorilla world.

HerpAquarium 

The HerpAquarium features over 100 species of reptiles, amphibians, and fish, from around the world including boa constrictors, Gila monsters, panther chameleons, Chinese alligators and black piranhas.
A notable resident of the HerpAquarium is a  rare albino American alligator named King Louie he is named after King Louis XVI of France, after whom the city of Louisville is also named. Louie was hatched at the St. Augustine Alligator Farm Zoological Park. The Louisville Zoo currently houses a group of critically endangered Panamanian golden frogs. The zoo is working to preserve this species of frog from extinction.  Their numbers have declined in the wild partly due to the chytrid fungus and habitat destruction. On March 31, 2006, the zoo added a group of seven common vampire bats obtained from the Philadelphia Zoo, and another ten from the Sedgwick County Zoo were added to the group in late May 2006. Eventually, the exhibit will house around 40 bats. The exhibit is designed to look like an old mine shaft.

Islands 

The zoo has a distinctive zoological exhibit called "Islands," which is the first zoological exhibit in the world that uses a system of rotating a variety of animals into one exhibit. This way, the animals can explore different habitats throughout the day, as they would in the wild.  This helps to give the animals needed stimulation and heightens their awareness. Moreover, the exhibit is the first to have natural predator and prey in the same space. It has  three outdoor exhibit areas and one indoor area. All animals in this exhibit are endangered or threatened species. The animals on display here change from day to day so that visitors can have a new and different experience with each visit to the zoo.  The animals that can be seen in this exhibit include Sumatran tigers, orangutans, siamangs, North Sulawesi babirusas and Malayan tapirs. The zoo is home to four orangutans, two males named Teak and Segundo (aka Gunny) and two females named Amber and Bella. Amber and Teak are half-siblings sharing the same father and are hybrid orangutans, while Gunny and Bella are purebred Sumatran orangutans and are under breeding recommendation, though there has yet to be any successful breeding between them. The Islands Pavilion is an indoor area that houses many species of birds, including the white-throated ground-dove. The zoo was the first zoo in the world to hatch this rare dove in captivity. The first hatchling was born on October 17, 2006, and a second followed on December 1, 2006. Some of the other bird species included in the Islands Pavilion are Victoria crowned pigeons, Nicobar pigeons, pied imperial pigeons, Jambu fruit doves, wompoo fruit doves, Asian fairy-bluebirds, red-crested cardinals, Indian white-eyes, black-necked stilts, Oriental storks, red shovelers, nene, African penguins and Inca terns. The pavilion also houses Rodrigues fruit bats, Aldabra giant tortoises, Cuban crocodiles, and Komodo dragons.

Wallaroo Walkabout 
The new Wallaroo Walkabout that opened in 2007 lets guests walk directly through the exhibit, which is home to common wallaroos and red-necked wallabies, as well as some Australian birds including the emu, laughing kookaburra and Cape Barren goose. Visitors are able to interact with the wallaroos and wallabies if they stay on the walkway. Then after the wallabies and wallaroos, guests can go into the Lorikeet Landing, which is an Australian exhibit that is a walkthrough aviary filled with several brightly colored birds known as lorikeets. Currently, the zoo houses 56 Lorikeets in a mixed flock consisting of 5 species of bird. Visitors can feed nectar to the birds right out of their hands. Wallaroo Walkabout is set to be renovated by 2025 to support Red kangaroo and Southern cassowary.

Glacier Run 
Finished in early 2011, this  outdoor exhibit is based on the theme of an old gold-mining town bordered by a glacier. It features polar bears, harbor seals, gray seals, California sea lions, grizzly bears, snowy owls and Steller's sea eagles. Outside the gold mine town are 3 exhibits for snow leopards, Amur tigers, and red-crowned cranes. The exhibit also has a splash park for children that opened in 2007, and was the first part of this $25 million exhibit to open. The exhibit also includes classrooms, party rooms available for rental, viewing areas above and below water, and a 200-seat outdoor auditorium for watching animal training demonstrations. Steller's sea eagle Pytr is housed in his own aviary set behind the sea lion amphitheater going 50ft vertically. Along side Pytr the aviary houses Azure-winged magpie, baer's pochard, and red-breasted goose in a small walk through enclosure.

Africa 
This region of the zoo is based on the African Serengeti. Animals featured here include lions, dromedary camels, southern white rhinoceroses, common warthogs, addaxes, meerkats, naked mole-rats, Hartmann's mountain zebras, Masai giraffe, Rüppell's griffon vultures, gray crowned cranes, wattled cranes, eastern bongos, a boma petting yard for Nigerian Dwarf goats, ring-tailed lemurs, and a new [monkey exhibit that opened in 2019 with colobus monkeys and red-tailed monkeys. The zoo is one of the few zoos to exhibit African and Asian elephants together in the same habitat. The zoo is home to an Asian elephant named Punch, who was born in 1970 and is currently the oldest Asian elephant in North America, and an African bush elephant named Mikki, who was born in 1985 and her son named Fitz, who was born in 2019. In 2022 the giraffe yard underwent a renovation replacing the fence and outdoor holding, the new exhibit is set to house multiple birds along side the giraffes like white stork and Rüppell's vulture.

Cats of the Americas  
This part of the zoo is next to the South America exhibit, and it has all rescued animals that cannot be returned to the wild. The animals include Canada lynxes, bald eagles, and pumas.

South America    
This exhibit of the zoo has animals from the Andes grasslands and Amazon rainforest of South America along with a botanical garden area. The animals contained in this exhibit include Chilean flamingos, maned wolves, Linnaeus's two-toed sloths, jaguars, hyacinth macaws, and guanacos. In fall of 2022 the original hyacinth macaw aviary from 1969 was demolished and is being fully renovated, it is set to re-open in spring of 2023. In 2023 46 new Chilean Flamingos are to join the flock from the San Diego Zoo, with these additions the flock will be one of the largest captive flocks in the world.

Kentucky Trails 
A roughly $30 million Upland South Safari known Kentucky trails, built over roughly 20 acres in an under-developed portion of the property, the area will be dedicated to animals from North America. Kentucky Trails is being built in partnership with Kentucky Fish and Wildlife to house and exhibit native animals from the Appalachian and Cumberland Gap regions. Notable enclosers include two rotational Great Plains inspired woodlands that will house American bison, elk, American black bears, bobcats and other native animals. A large Rickhouse Hall inspired education center and restaurant is also to be built. Breaking ground is set in 2023 with the exhibit expected to open in 2025.

Notable individual animals 
 Mojo, a patas monkey previously owned by NASCAR driver Tony Stewart, was given to the zoo on August 24, 2007, when he became too aggressive to keep as a pet.
 Scotty, an African elephant born on March 18, 2007, was the first elephant born in Kentucky. Scotty died on May 12, 2010, when he was only three years old, due to severe gastric and intestinal problems.
 The Louisville Zoo has hand-raised three baby siamangs—Sungai (from the San Francisco Zoo), Zoli (born at the Louisville Zoo), and Zain (from the Albuquerque Biological Park) after Zoli's parents died of E. coli sepsis and the other two were brought in as companions—and is thought to be the only Zoo to ever hand raise three baby siamangs this young.
 The zoo is also home to several black-footed ferrets, and participates in the black-footed ferret breeding program. The ferrets are one of the most endangered species in North America.
 Bakari (whose name is Swahili for hopeful) the Masai giraffe was born on February 17, 2009, with angular limb deformity, and had periosteal stripping performed on his leg. He is believed to be the first giraffe to undergo this procedure.
Born in 2011 in Alaska polar bear Qannik was found orphaned on Alaska's North Slope. The Alaska Zoo quickly sprang into action and captured the young cub, during this time the zoo was building Glacier Run and this new exhibit was deemed an ideal place for the new cub to go to by the AZA. Soon with the partnership of UPS the cub was transported via air to the zoo in what was known as "Operation Snowflake".
 In June 2013, the Louisville Zoo organized a contest to name the first zebra foal to be born at the zoo in 13 years. The foal was ultimately named Ziva, after the fictional character Ziva David from the television series NCIS.
 On October 23, 2014, the zoo announced that their 11-year-old reticulated python, Thelma, had produced six healthy baby snakes in 2012 without any prior interaction with a male. She is the first known individual of her species (the world's largest species of snake) to have done so in captivity. It had initially been thought that the offspring were produced from long-stored sperm, until genetic testing showed that the neonates were "half clones" – i.e., she was their only genetic parent.

Events 
 The Louisville Zoo offers multiple chances to enjoy the zoo after normal operating hours. One of the most popular after-hours events is the "World's Largest Halloween Party". This event is held on October 31 yearly and is Halloween themed. Another popular event is "Brew at the Zoo", which is an event that brings together local restaurants and craft beer vendors. Live entertainment is also provided. This event is typically in August and regularly sells out.

Mammals

Reptiles and Amphibians

Birds

Fish

Arthropods

Activities 
During October, the zoo hosts the "World's Largest Halloween Party", one of the largest Halloween parties in the United States.

The zoo has a booth called "Handimals" located by the entrance where kids can make an animal out of their hand prints.

Often when an animal is born in the zoo, the zoo holds a contest where participants send in ideas for names.

Incidents 

On July 1, 1994, a man was picked up and dropped several times by an African elephant named Kenya. As a result of the man's injuries, his spleen and part of his pancreas were removed. The elephant had just finished giving rides to zoo visitors and was being led away when she wandered off and picked up the man. Zoo officials said that the elephant, who was normally considered calm and docile, was just "horsing around".

On June 1, 2009, the zoo train derailed. Three open-air cars and the engine went off the tracks and caused the passenger car to topple over, due to excessive speed and operator inexperience. The incident injured 22 people. An Indiana family that was on the train when the accident happened sued the Louisville Zoo. Amy and Darren Bamforth filed the lawsuit on June 10, 2009. Another family in Louisville who was on the train, also filed a suit. They sought unspecified monetary damages as well as a court order preventing the zoo from altering or destroying the train while the lawsuit proceeds.  A spokesman for the zoo declined to comment. The zoo train was closed for four years. On July 2, 2013, the zoo train reopened to the public after buying new trains and investing in expanded training procedures. All legal actions regarding the incident were concluded as of October 2015.

Gallery

See also 
 List of attractions and events in the Louisville metropolitan area
 List of parks in the Louisville metropolitan area
 Senning's Park, Louisville's first zoo

References

External links 

 

Tourist attractions in Louisville, Kentucky
Zoos in Kentucky
Buildings and structures in Louisville, Kentucky
1969 establishments in Kentucky
Zoos established in 1969